The Battle of Ravenna, fought on 11 April 1512, was a major battle of the War of the League of Cambrai. It pitted forces of the Holy League against France and their Ferrarese allies. Although the French and Ferrarese eliminated the Papal-Spanish forces as a serious threat, their triumph was overshadowed by the loss of their young general Gaston of Foix. The victory therefore did not help them secure northern Italy. The French withdrew entirely from Italy in the summer of 1512, as Swiss mercenaries hired by Pope Julius II and Imperial troops under Emperor Maximilian I arrived in Lombardy. The Sforza were restored to power in Milan.

Monster of Ravenna

A month before the battle, multiple sources reported a monstrous birth which became known as the Monster of Ravenna. This child's terrifying features included a horn on its forehead, wings, an eye on its knee, and a clawed foot, according to Florentine chronicler Luca Landucci. Its appearance was a cause for alarm, and news spread across Europe in the diaries of contemporary writers.

Most accounts, including that of Landucci's, associate the "monster's" appearance with the battle it preceded; its appearance was taken for a bad omen of future suffering, and the French medical professional Ambroise Paré opined that the creature's birth was a direct sign of God's wrath, brought to bear in the form of Louis XII's army. Regardless, the Monster of Ravenna acquired theological implications which evolved beyond the one battle and persisted well into the Protestant Reformation.

Prelude

Beginning in February 1512, the French forces in Italy, newly commanded by Gaston de Foix, Duc de Nemours, had been engaged in capturing cities in the Romagna and the Veneto, in an attempt to deny control of those regions to the forces of the Holy League.  Although he had been successful in a number of sieges, Nemours was aware that the impending invasion of France by Henry VIII of England would cause much of his army to be withdrawn, and he was determined to force the main army of the Holy League into battle before that occurred.  Thus, in late March, Nemours, together with an Italian contingent under Alfonso I d'Este, Duke of Ferrara, marched east from Bologna. The French army reached Ravenna on April 8th and started a bombardment of the city on the following day. A general assault was launched after a breach was made, but the attack was repulsed by Papal troops who defended the city. Over the next couple of days, the French forces attempted three “fruitless assaults.”  

Julius II, alarmed at the prospect of losing his last stronghold in the Romagna, demanded that an army be sent to relieve the city; Ramón de Cardona had to comply, and the Spanish army set out for Ravenna with a company of Papal troops in tow.  By 9 April, they had passed Forlì, and were advancing north along the Ronco River towards the city, and on the next day had reached Molinaccio, only a mile south of the French positions, but still separated from them by the Ronco.  Gaston of Foix, short on supplies and increasingly anxious to give battle before he was forced to withdraw from Italy, ordered a general attack be launched. On the morning of Easter day, April 11th, the French army left camp, crossed the Ronco, and approached the Spanish-Papal position.

Battle

Dispositions

The strengths, relative positions, and commanders of the component elements of both armies are unclear, and different arrangements are given by historians.  The French army formed up in an arc to the east of Cardona's fortified camp; closest to the river were about 900 men-at-arms of the "vaward", under Jacques de La Palice and Alfonso d'Este.  Next to this cavalry was the bulk of the infantry.  According to Charles Oman, it consisted of three separate units: 3,500 Gascon crossbowmen, 5,000 landsknechts under Jacob Empser, and 3,000 Picards and Gascons under Thomas Bohier, the Seneschal of Normandy.  Frederick Taylor groups the infantry into only two units: 9,500 landsknechts under Empser and 8,000 "Gascon archers and Picard pikemen" under the Seigneur de Molart.  The men-at-arms of the "main-battle", consisting of 780 men, was commanded by either Bohier alone, or by Bohier together with the Vicomte de Lautrec, Louis d'Ars, and the Chevalier de Bayard.  This cavalry occupied one of two positions: according to Oman and Thomas Arnold, it was placed in the arc to the left of the French infantry, while Taylor has it behind the cavalry of the "vaward", next to the river.  Farther to the left of the French line—beyond the cavalry of the "main-battle", according to Arnold and Oman, or directly flanking the infantry, according to Taylor—was the "rearward" corps of the army, commanded by Yves d'Alégre.  It consisted of about 4,000 mostly Italian infantry under Frederigo de Bozzolo, flanked, on the extreme left, by about 2,000 light cavalry under Gian Bernardo Caracciolo. The French force also included 50 "modern cannons," built and brought by Alfonso I d'Este, Duke of Ferrara. These cannons fired all-metal cannonballs and had a faster rate of fire compared to older guns

The arrangement of the Holy League army is similarly a matter of dispute; Oman comments that "the array of Cardona's army, though elaborately described by more than one narrator, is not very easy to make out."  At the north end of the camp, near the river, was the cavalry of the "vaward", consisting of about 670 Papal men-at-arms under Fabrizio Colonna.  Farther along the river were two more bodies of men-at-arms: the "main-battle", consisting of 565 men under the Marquis of La Palude, and the rearguard, consisting of 490 men under Alfonso Carvajal.  Taylor divides the Holy League infantry into four blocks: three divisions of Spanish infantry, each consisting of four colunellas of 500–600 men each, and one formation of Papal infantry, numbering about 2,000, all under the general command of Pedro Navarro; Taylor places the formations of infantry in a deep column parallel to the river, on the far side of the cavalry, and perpendicular to the entrenchments.  Oman and Arnold place the infantry in three lines running along the length of the entrenchments; no number is given for the first of these, but the second is given as consisting of 4,000 men, and the third, placed as a reserve, as including "three Spanish foot regiments" as well as the 2,000 Papal infantry.  Beyond the infantry—to the far side of it from the river, according to Taylor, or at the end of its line, according to Oman and Arnold—was the light cavalry, consisting of 1,500–1,700 Spanish ginetes and Italian mounted arquebusiers under the command of Fernando d'Avalos, Marquis of Pescara.  In his section on war wagons Arnold avers that the Spanish "had at least thirty carts mounting scythe blades, forward-projecting spears and organ guns.

Artillery exchange

The advancing French troops halted about two hundred paces from the enemy lines.  The sporadic exchange of artillery fire that had been taking place since the French had begun to cross the Ronco now developed into a full-scale artillery duel between the two armies that lasted more than two hours.  A new tactic, the open-field exchange of artillery fire was "the most violent cannonade between armies in the field that the world had yet seen", according to Taylor, and "the first of its kind in the historical record", according to Bert Hall.

De Foix placed the bulk of his artillery in front of the French right wing, directing its fire into the Holy League's camp.  Navarro ordered his infantry to take cover—the troops hid in the trenches, or lay prone on the slopes of the river embankments—but Colonna's men-at-arms had no shelter available, and began to take heavy casualties from the cannon fire.  The Spanish artillery, meanwhile, ignored the French cavalry and concentrated its fire on the massed Gascons and landsknechts in the French center.  The Spanish fire was, according to Oman, "excessively murderous", and casualties among the French infantry were substantial; as many as 2,000 men were killed, and the Gascons were so shaken by the fire that the landsknechts were forced to push them back with pikes in order to keep them in line.

Not content with bombarding the camp from one side, the French moved to enfilade it from the flanks.  The Duke of Ferrara, who had apparently been acting independently of the main army since the crossing of the Ronco, had moved twenty-four of his cannon around the rear of the French position, finally bringing them up on the left flank, facing Pescara's light cavalry.  From this position, d'Este's guns inflicted heavy casualties on Pescara and Carvajal's cavalry; so intense was the fire that some of it overshot the camp, inflicting casualties on the French troops on the other side.  Yves d'Alègre, meanwhile, had devised a similar plan on the other flank; re-crossing the Ronco with two heavy guns, he positioned them across the river from the Spanish camp—directly to the rear of Colonna's position.  The fire of these two guns inflicted massive casualties on Colonna's closely packed cavalry.

Cavalry fight

Pressed from both sides by the fire of the French and Ferrarese artillery, the Holy League's cavalry could not hold their positions indefinitely.  The first to move were the heavy cavalry of the rearguard under Carvajal, riding out from the entrenchments towards the Ferrarese guns on the French left; according to Taylor, Carvajal's advance was disorderly and possibly spontaneous.  Carvajal was quickly joined by Pescara's light cavalry and by the Marquis of La Palude, both having been sent forward by Cardona; together, these bodies of cavalry advanced on the French line, Palude moving directly forwards while Pescara attempted a flanking movement.  The target of the cavalry attack is inconsistently named among contemporary sources; both Oman and Taylor agree that it must have been the heavy cavalry of the French "main-battle", commanded by Foix, Lautrec, and the Seneschal of Normandy, which had apparently moved towards the French left.

Carvajal, Pescara, and Palude converged on the French cavalry, which split into two bodies and met both Spanish attacks head-on.  The initial Spanish charges were unsuccessful in breaking the French line; Taylor attributes their failure to the depleted morale of the Spanish cavalry after the artillery bombardment, the effect of "ditches and vegetation" on the Spanish formations, the better tactics of the French, and the arrival of reinforcements sent by La Palice from the French vanguard.  The bodies of French and Spanish cavalry then engaged in a lengthy fight along the left of the French positions.

Meanwhile, Fabrizio Colonna, having seen the other Spanish cavalry engaged, rode out between the Ronco and the Spanish trenches and charged the French line; his target is similarly the subject of disagreement among contemporary sources, but Oman and Taylor agree that he must have attacked the portion of the French vanguard under La Palice which the latter had not sent to assist Foix in the center.  As Colonna and La Palice fought along the French right, d'Alègre, who had earlier been summoned by La Palice, arrived with 400 fresh heavy cavalry, as well as the infantry of the French reserve.  Colonna's formation, pressed from multiple directions, began to disintegrate, with some of his men-at-arms fleeing the field and others retreating south to where the other Spanish cavalry was engaged.

D'Alègre followed the retreating Spanish troops to the center, where the remnants of the Spanish cavalry were engaged in a desperate melee against the French.  Finally, when a part of the French vanguard joined the fight as well, the Spanish cavalry broke; Pescara and La Palude were taken prisoner, Colonna retreated back into the Spanish entrenchments, and Carvajal and Cardona fled south-west towards Cesena.  A large part of the French cavalry pursued the retreating Spanish, while the others turned to take part in the infantry fight which had unfolded in the meantime.

Infantry fight

As the Spanish cavalry was making its initial attack, Foix had sent orders for the French infantry to advance on the Holy League's camp.  A mixed group of 2,000 Gascon crossbowmen and 1,000 Picard pikemen, gathered from Molart's and Bozollo's troops, advanced towards the camp; according to Taylor, they moved along a path between the embankment and the river, and were shielded from view by the former.  The Gascons advanced to the edge of the Spanish entrenchments and began to fire onto the Spanish infantry; according to Oman, they were immediately driven back by "a blistering fire of arquebuses and swivel guns", while Taylor writes that Navarro moved the Papal infantry forward to engage them.

The main column of landsknechts had meanwhile made its way to the edge of the Spanish entrenchments, and begun to force its way into the fortified camp.  Jacob Empser and his lieutenant Fabian von Schlabendorf were both killed in the initial push, but parts of the German column finally crossed the ditch and engaged the waiting Spanish infantry hand-to-hand.  The Spanish swordsmen inflicted massive casualties among the landsknechts—who were unable to defend themselves with long pikes at such close quarters—and the German column recoiled back across the trenches, having suffered more than a thousand casualties.

The landsknechts and the Gascons proceeded to attack once more, with even greater casualties. Fabrizio Colonna, who had by this time returned to the camp with the remnants of his cavalry, charged into the flank of the attacking infantry; he would write that "with 200 lances he could have retrieved the fortune of the day".  Two companies of Spanish infantry attacked the Gascons engaged on the riverbank, breaking their formation, killing Molart, and pursuing them back towards the French artillery positions.  The remaining infantry on both sides continued meanwhile to struggle across the entrenchments.

Endgame

At this juncture, the French cavalry—both those that had returned from the pursuit of Cardona and those that had remained on the field—descended on the Spanish infantry from all sides.  Together with the German and Gascon infantry, which had reformed and now renewed its attacks, the French cavalry overwhelmed the Spanish formations, inflicting terrible casualties; Colonna and Navarro were both wounded and captured as they tried to rally the defenders.  A few thousand of the Spanish infantry managed to escape, fleeing towards Cesena and Forlì; the others were "ridden over and trampled down", according to Oman.

The two Spanish companies which had earlier routed the Gascons, having found their path north barred by the French rearguard under the Bastard du Fay, had meanwhile retraced their path along the river back towards the camp.  Marching south along the embankment, they were attacked by Gaston de Foix and his personal staff, numbering about fifteen; in the ensuing melee, the French knights were scattered, Foix was killed, and the Spanish proceeded to withdraw from the field.  A few miles from the battlefield, the Spanish infantry encountered Bayard, returning from his pursuit of Cardona; lacking the numbers to break them, Bayard let them pass, not knowing that they had just killed his commander.

Aftermath

The battle went on for eight hours and left, by contemporary accounts, more than 10,000 dead between both sides. The death of Gaston de Foix was a huge blow to the French, and his men were very sad to hear of his death. The young, talented general had a very high command level and had masterminded a remarkable string of victories in Italy. He was inspiring and faithful to his men. The Italian Wars might have taken a very different course had he survived the battle.

Following the death of Gaston de Foix, command of the French army fell to La Palice, who had little interest in pursuing the retreating Spanish forces, preferring instead to return to the siege of Ravenna.  The city soon fell, and the French proceeded to thoroughly sack it for 3 days.  However, much of the French army was withdrawn to France following the battle, and La Palice was forced to extricate himself from Italy in August by renewed efforts on the part of the Holy League.

The Spanish forces in Italy were almost entirely destroyed at Ravenna, but Cardona would raise another army and appear in Lombardy in 1513.  In the meantime, both Navarro and Colonna would see combat, Colonna in command of an Italian army and Navarro in the service of Francis I of France.

Notes

Bibliography 
 Arnold, Thomas F. The Renaissance at War. Smithsonian History of Warfare, edited by John Keegan. New York: Smithsonian Books / Collins, 2006. .
 Baumgartner, Frederic J. Louis XII. New York: St. Martin's Press, 1994. .
 Black, Jeremy. "Dynasty Forged by Fire." MHQ: The Quarterly Journal of Military History 18, no. 3 (Spring 2006): 34–43. .
 ———. European Warfare, 1494–1660. Warfare and History, edited by Jeremy Black. London: Routledge, 2002. .
 
 Guicciardini, Francesco. The History of Italy. Translated by Sydney Alexander. Princeton: Princeton University Press, 1984. .
 Hall, Bert S.  Weapons and Warfare in Renaissance Europe: Gunpowder, Technology, and Tactics.  Baltimore: Johns Hopkins University Press, 1997. .
 Mallett, M. E. and J. R. Hale.  The Military Organization of a Renaissance State: Venice c. 1400 to 1617.  Cambridge: Cambridge University Press, 2006.  .
 Najemy, John M.  A History of Florence: 1200–1575.  Malden, Mass.: Blackwell Publishing, 2006.  .
 
 Norwich, John Julius. A History of Venice. New York: Vintage Books, 1989. .
 Oman, Charles. A History of the Art of War in the Sixteenth Century.  London: Methuen & Co., 1937.
  Based on the Malgaigne edition of 1840. 
 Phillips, Charles and Alan Axelrod. Encyclopedia of Wars. Volume 2. New York: Facts on File, 2005. .
 Taylor, Frederick Lewis. The Art of War in Italy, 1494–1529. Westport, Conn.: Greenwood Press, 1973. First published 1921 by Cambridge University Press. .

Battle of Ravenna (1512)
Battles involving France
Battles involving Spain
Battles of the War of the League of Cambrai
Battles involving the Papal States
Battle of Ravenna (1512)
Ravenna
Battles involving the Duchy of Ferrara
Battles in Emilia-Romagna